Inverness Cathedral (Scottish Gaelic: Cathair-Eaglais Inbhir Nis), also known as the Cathedral Church of Saint Andrew (1866–69), is a cathedral of the Scottish Episcopal Church situated in the city of Inverness in Scotland close to the banks of the River Ness. It is the seat of the Bishop of Moray, Ross and Caithness, ordinary of the Diocese of Moray, Ross and Caithness. The cathedral is the northernmost extant diocesan cathedral in mainland Britain - Dornoch Cathedral, Fortrose Cathedral and Elgin Cathedral are no longer acting as diocesan cathedrals. It was the first new Protestant cathedral to be completed in Great Britain since the Reformation.

History
Bishop Robert Eden decided that the cathedral for the united Diocese of Moray, Ross and Caithness should be in Inverness. The foundation stone was laid by the Archbishop of Canterbury, Charles Longley, in 1866 and construction was complete by 1869, although a lack of funds precluded the building of the two giant spires of the original design. The architect was Alexander Ross, who was based in the city. The cathedral is built of red Tarradale stone, with the nave columns of Peterhead granite.

The cathedral congregation began as a mission in 1853, on the opposite side (east) of the River Ness.

Bells 
The cathedral contains a ring of ten bells, which are noted as being the most northerly peal of change-ringing bells in a church in the world. The tenor bell weighs 17 cwt.

List of provosts
The following have served as Provost of Inverness Cathedral:

 Robert Eden
 James Kelly
 Herbert Mather (1891 to 1897)
 Allan Webb (1898 to 1901)
 Vernon Staley
 Reginald Mitchell-Innes (1911 to 1918)
 Alexander MacKenzie (1918 to 1949)
 Leslie Pennell (1949 to 1965)
 Frank Laming (1966 to 1974)
 Jack Woods (1975 to 1980)
 Arthur Wheatley (1980 to 1983)
 Gordon Reid (1984 to 1988)
 Alan Horsley (1988 to 1991)
 Malcolm Grant (1991 to 2002)
 Michael Hickford (2003 to 2004) 
 Alex Gordon (2005 to 2014)
 Sarah Murray (2017 to present)

Gallery

See also
St Michael & All Angels, Inverness

References

External links

 Inverness Cathedral site 

Cathedrals of the Scottish Episcopal Church
Andrew's
Category A listed buildings in Highland (council area)
Listed cathedrals in Scotland
Gothic Revival church buildings in Scotland
Tourist attractions in Highland (council area)
Diocese of Moray, Ross and Caithness
Anglo-Catholic church buildings in Scotland